Delrex is a plastic that is used to replace tortoiseshell since the trade of tortoiseshell was banned in the late 1970s.

Delrex is used as the material for Dunlop's "Gator" guitar picks. The tortoise series are also made from Delrin but with a different surface.

Plastic brands